Whitney Issik  is a Canadian politician who was elected in the 2019 Alberta general election to represent the electoral district of Calgary-Glenmore in the 30th Alberta Legislature. Since July 8, 2021, she has served as Alberta's Associate Minister of Status of Women. She also played Canadian football for the Calgary Rage in the Western Women's Canadian Football League.

Electoral history

References

United Conservative Party MLAs
Living people
Politicians from Calgary
Women MLAs in Alberta
21st-century Canadian women politicians
21st-century Canadian politicians
Year of birth missing (living people)